The Vintage Yachting Games are an international Quadrennial multi class sailing event for former Olympic classes and the former Classes of the Paralympic Games. The Vintage Games is held every four years.

The idea behind the Vintage is to Organize a four yearly high-end event in the calendars of all the former (Paralympic) Olympic Classes after their discontinuation at the Olympics or Paralympic Games. First the idea was discusses and developed locally by Rudy den Outer and representatives of several Dutch class organizations of former Olympic classes (Martijn van der Driest of Europe, Harold Wijgers of Flying Dutchman, Johan Offermans of Soling, Michiel van Dis of Dragon and Hans Nadorp of 5.5 Metre). In the next phase the presidents/chairman of the international classes became involved (Jan Abrahamsen of Europe class, Theo Meus of O-Jolle, Alberto Barenghi of Flying Dutchman, Rose Hoeksema of Soling and Rupert Fisher of Dragon).

The first edition was held in Medemblik 20–27 September 2008. During the closing ceremony the next host country, Italy, received the Vintage flag from the mayor of Medemblik, Th. van Eijk.

The Vintage Yachting Games Organization (VYGO), a foundation under Dutch Law, was founded on 11 December 2006 by Rudy den Outer, Nancy Schoof and Sebastian Hopf. The VYGO has since become the governing body of the Vintage Yachting Games, whose structure and actions are defined by her constitution and charter. The VYGO’s ownership lies with the Vintage Yachting Classes.

Vintage Yachting Games principles 
The Vintage Yachting Games are governed by the following set of principles:
 Charter Vintage Yachting Games
 Constitution Vintage Yachting Games
 VYGrules
 Standard VYG Notice of Race
 Standard VYG Sailing Instructions

Charter Vintage Yachting Games 
The constitution of the Vintage Yachting Games Organization is based upon the Vintage Yachting Games Charter. Decisions made by the board or supervisory board and even race management must be in line with this charter:
 Sailing is a sport to be performed with light sailing vessels (yachts). Sailing is done by sailors. Sailors participate in the sport in order to win races or series. This winning must be reached only by fair sailing, superior speed, strategically and tactical maneuvering, use of knowledge, excellent performance of skill and showing correct behavior
 The Vintage Yachting Games is the result of the organized action, carried out under the authority of the Stichting Vintage Yachting Games Organization (VYGO), of all participating individuals and entities who like the game of Sailing. Its symbol is the yachts logo
 All Individual Competitors, Judges, Coaches, Measurers, Members of the Regatta Committee, Sponsors, Organizers, Supervisory Board Members as well as Board Members regard the Competing Sailor in the Vintage Yachting Games as the most important stakeholder of the Vintage Yachting Games. They must act in order to guard the interest of those Sailors. The way active and competitive sailors want to play the game of Sailing is paramount for the Vintage Yachting Games
 The interest of Vintage Yachting Games sailors in a specific class will be guarded by the relevant International Class Organizations (ICO) participating in the Vintage Yachting Games Organization’s Supervisory Board
 During the Vintage Yachting Games the sailors represent their National Class Organization (NCO) In the absence of a NCO the relevant ICO will act in her place
 Any form of discrimination with regard to a country or a person on grounds of race, religion, politics, gender or otherwise is incompatible with the object Vintage Yachting Games and its organization

Constitution of Vintage Yachting Games 
The constitution governs the way of management of the VYGO. This is the deed under Dutch law of the VYGO foundation.

VYG rules 
Describes under what conditions the Vintage Yachting Games edition will be sailed, organized and managed.

Standard VYG Notice of Race (NOR) 
This document is the basis of the final NOR that is determined in cooperation by the Host club and the VYGO. The final NOR must be published at least one year before the start of the first race of a Vintage Yachting Games edition.

Standard VYG Sailing Instructions (SI) 
This document is the basis of the final SI that is determined in cooperation by the Host club and the VYGO. The final SI must be published at least one month before the first race of a Vintage Yachting Games edition.

Vintage Yachting Games Event Structure 

The structure of an edition of the Vintage Yachting Games is similar to that of an Olympic sailing event. It consists of:
 Opening ceremony if possible with fleet review
 A series of races per Vintage Yachting Class (at least 7 scheduled)
 A closing ceremony that includes the Vintage InterPares (VIP) race and medal presentation. Also the country trophy will be handed to the winning country.
 Passing of the Vintage Yachting Games Flag to the next host country
 Celebration

Fleet review 
The fleet review of is a part of the opening ceremony of the Vintage. The element can be compared with the athletes parade into the stadium  at the opening of the Olympics.

The races of the Vintage Yachting Games 

Each edition of the Vintage Yachting Games will have a series of at least seven scheduled races per Vintage Yachting Class. At least five races must be completed to make a valid series. The top three of each Vintage class are granted the right to fly the Vintage Yachting Games logo in gold, silver or bronze in her mainsail for the next four years.

Vintage InterPares race 

As a part of the closing ceremony the winning helmsman of each class will sail one final race in a former Olympic class. The winner will be win the title of Vintage InterPares (VIP) and is granted the right to fly the Vintage Yachting Games logo in her sail for the next four years. The VIP race is the substitute for the medalrace during the Olympic sailing event. In 2008 the 12' Dinghy was used for the VIP race.

Country Trophy 

The country trophy is handed to the national team of the best performing country during an edition of the Vintage. This trophy is donated by the artist, sailor, International Judge and former international umpire Menno Meyer.

Venues

Classes 

To become a Vintage Yachting Class a class must:
 Be a former Olympic class or former Class in the Paralympics 
 Still be sailed in regattas in five or more countries 
 Have one single set of class rules
 Be represented in the VYGO's supervisory board.

The Vintage Yachting Classes consist of 13 Classes. The Vintage Yachting Classes are eligible for competition in the Vintage Yachting Games.

 • = Event in this year
 VIP = Used for the Vintage Inter Pares race
  = Open event
  = Female event
  = Male event

Facts and figures 
These facts and figures aere based upon the entries documented in the Official Vintage Results and on the Wikipedia pages:
2008 Vintage Yachting Games
2008 Vintage Yachting Games – Europe Female
2008 Vintage Yachting Games – Europe Male
2008 Vintage Yachting Games – O-Jolle
2008 Vintage Yachting Games – Flying Dutchman
2008 Vintage Yachting Games – Soling
2008 Vintage Yachting Games – Dragon
2012 Vintage Yachting Games
2012 Vintage Yachting Games – Women's Europe
2012 Vintage Yachting Games – Men's Europe
2012 Vintage Yachting Games – O-Jolle
2012 Vintage Yachting Games – Flying Dutchman
2012 Vintage Yachting Games – Tempest
2012 Vintage Yachting Games – Soling
2012 Vintage Yachting Games – Dragon
2012 Vintage Yachting Games – 5.5 Metre
2018 Vintage Yachting Games

Country trophy

Medal table

Statistics
The statistics are based upon the boats that are taken into account in the final results. For 2008 this were all entries. For 2012 only the paid entries.

Vintage InterPares

Medal leaders (by Vintage)

Multiple medalists

Ranking of Vintage Gold medalists
The ranking is done based upon the 1964 Olympic scoring system. Best seven races count. If less than seven races are sailed 0 points are given to the cancelled (can) races.

References
Information about the former Olympic classes can be verified in the book: Vintage Yachting Games, Olympic Classes

Vintage Yachting Games
Sports organizations established in 2006
Quadrennial sporting events
Yachting races